Stress hormones are secreted by endocrine glands to modify one's internal environment during times of stress.  By performing various functions such as mobilizing energy sources, increasing heart rate, and downregulating metabolic processes which are not immediately necessary, stress hormones promote the survival of the organism.  The secretions of some hormones are also downplayed during stress. Stress hormones include, but are not limited to:
 Cortisol, the main human stress hormone
 Catecholamines such as adrenaline and norepinephrine
 Vasopressin
 Growth hormone

References 

Stress (biology)
Hormones